El Far (cim de Susqueda) is a mountain of the Guilleries Massif, Catalonia, Spain. It has an elevation of 1,122.8 metres above sea level. There is a chapel up de mountain known as Santuari del Far.

See also
Guilleries 
Mountains of Catalonia

References

Mountains of Catalonia
Emblematic summits of Catalonia